Latouche-Tréville was a F70 type anti-submarine destroyer of the French Navy (Marine Nationale).

The French Navy does not use the term "destroyer" for its ships. Thus, some large ships, referred to as "frégates" in French, are registered as destroyers. And additionally, some minor ships, referred to as "avisos" in French, are registered as frigates.

She was the third French vessel named after the 18-19th century politician and admiral Louis-René Levassor de Latouche Tréville.

Service history

In November 2006 and again in June 2010, Latouche-Tréville visited London on diplomatic duties, and was moored alongside the Second World War cruiser, .

In mid 2009, she was filmed in stormy seas as part of the documentary Oceans. In late 2009, while attached to an international force of NATO vessels, Latouche-Tréville visited Portsmouth Naval Base in the United Kingdom with vessels of the Dutch, Norwegian, Spanish and Turkish navies.

On 15 October 2012, the frigate was moored at Leith Docks in Scotland.

On 18 April 2015, she escorted a replica of the 18th century sailing ship  as it departed La Rochelle, France on her maiden voyage across the Atlantic to Yorktown, Virginia in the United States. Latouche-Tréville returned to Brest with the ship on 10 August. In May, Latouche-Tréville was among a dozen surface vessels and four submarines that took part in NATO's annual "Dynamic Mongoose" military exercise. Amid rising tensions with Russia, the two-week event in Norwegian waters saw ships under NATO command conducting a variety of anti-submarine warfare operations. On 4 June, she was moored again at Leith Docks in Scotland.

On 9 January 2020, the vessel suffered damage in a storm soon after departing from Brest, and returned to port the next day with her top mast missing. The incident also destroyed an electronic warfare pod and damaged the starboard SYRACUSE system. As of 2020, with the retirement of her sister ship , Latouche-Tréville was the last vessel of her class in service.

In March 2022, the frigate deployed to the Baltic Sea for exercises with other NATO navies. On the deployment the ship embarked an older Alouette III helicopter. She returned to Brest in June 2022.

The frigate was withdrawn from service on 1 July 2022.

References

External links
  Video of ship in heavy seas

Georges Leygues-class frigates
Frigates of France
Ships built in France
1988 ships